The foothill stipplethroat or foothill antwren (Epinecrophylla spodionota) is a species of bird in the family Thamnophilidae. It is found in Peru, Ecuador and southwestern Colombia. Its natural habitats are subtropical or tropical moist lowland forests and subtropical or tropical moist montane forests.

The foothill stipplethroat was described by the English ornithologists Philip Sclater and Osbert Salvin in 1880 and given the binomial name Myrmotherula spodionota.  It was subsequently placed in the genus Myrmotherula. The present genus Epinecrophylla was erected in 2006.

The foothill stipplethroat has two subspecies:
 Epinecrophylla spodionota spodionota (Sclater & Salvin, 1880) - southern Colombia to northern Peru
 Epinecrophylla spodionota sororia (von Berlepsch & Stolzmann, 1894) - Peru

References

foothill stipplethroat
Birds of the Ecuadorian Andes
Birds of the Peruvian Andes
foothill stipplethroat
foothill stipplethroat
foothill stipplethroat
Taxonomy articles created by Polbot